Niels Tune-Hansen (born 19 January 1953) is a Danish former professional footballer who played at as a defender. He made 15 appearances for the Denmark national team scoring one goal.

Career
Tune-Hansen began his career in his hometown club Holbæk B&I, where he scored six goals in 64 games between 1972 and 1976.

Ahead of the 1976–77 2. Bundesliga season, Tune-Hansen moved to FC St. Pauli. He made his debut on 14 August 1975 in the 1–0 defeat by Wuppertaler SV, and scored his first goal in the game in a 1–1 draw against 1. SC Göttingen 05. Tune-Hansen becamea regular starter, played all 38 games and scoring eight goals. At the end of the season his team won promotion to the Bundesliga.

Tune-Hansen played his first Bundesliga game on the first matchday in a 3–1 win over Werder Bremen. At the end of the 1977–78 season, his club suffered direct relegation. That season, Tune-Hansen had scored one goal in 33 Bundesliga appearances, which was against Bayern Munich, but he also scored an own goal in the 4–0 defeat against 1. FC Saarbrücken.

After another season in the jersey of the St. Pauli, Tune-Hansen left the club after the club did not receive a license and was therefore relocated to the Oberliga Nord. He signed with VfL Osnabrück for the 1979–80 season. He made his debut on the first matchday of the season against SV Arminia Hannover (2–0 loss). There, too, he became a regular starter, and left the club after three years where they had finished in midtable in the 2. Bundesliga. His departure also marked the end of a six-year stint in Germany with 220 games and 27 goals. He then returned to hometown club Holbæk B&I.

After three more years in Holbæk, Tune-Hansen ended his active career in the 1985 season in Denmark.

References

External links

1953 births
Living people
People from Holbæk Municipality
Danish men's footballers
Association football defenders
Denmark international footballers
Holbæk B&I players
FC St. Pauli players
VfL Osnabrück players
Bundesliga players
2. Bundesliga players
Danish 1st Division players
Danish 2nd Division players
Danish expatriate men's footballers
Danish expatriate sportspeople in Germany
Expatriate footballers in Germany
Sportspeople from Region Zealand